Bucan was a nobleman in the Kingdom of Hungary, who, according to a non-authentic charter, served as Judge royal and ispán of Bihar County in 1135, during the reign of Béla II of Hungary.

References

Sources
  Zsoldos, Attila (2011). Magyarország világi archontológiája, 1000–1301 ("Secular Archontology of Hungary, 1000–1301"). História, MTA Történettudományi Intézete. Budapest. 

Judges royal
12th-century Hungarian people